Wilfred Batten Lewis Trotter, FRS (3 November 1872 – 25 November 1939) was an English surgeon, a pioneer in neurosurgery. He was also known for his studies on social psychology, most notably for his concept of the herd instinct, which he first outlined in two published papers in 1908, and later in his famous popular work Instincts of the Herd in Peace and War, an early classic of crowd psychology. Trotter argued that gregariousness was an instinct, and studied beehives, flocks of sheep and wolf packs.

Life
Born in Coleford, Gloucestershire in 1872, Trotter moved to London to attend college at age 16. An excellent medical student, he decided to specialise in surgery and was appointed Surgical Registrar at University College Hospital in 1901 and Assistant Surgeon in 1906. He opened his own practice after obtaining his medical degree. He was also a keen writer, with an interest in science and philosophy. In 1908, he published two papers on the subject of herd mentality, which were precursors to his later, more famous, work.

Working at University College Hospital in London as professor of surgery, he held the office of Honorary Surgeon to King George V from 1928 to 1932. He was also a member of the Council of the Royal Society that conferred their Honorary Membership on Professor Freud, whom he had met earlier at psychoanalytic gatherings, and whom he attended after his move to England. He was consulted about Freud's terminal cancer, in 1938.  He was elected a Fellow of the Royal Society in May 1931 and elected President of the Association of Surgeons in 1932. In the last years of his life, he became professor and director of the surgical unit at UCH and turned to writing on a larger scale. In 1938 he was awarded the Gold Medal of the Royal Society of Medicine.

He died in Blackmoor, Hampshire in 1939. The Collected Papers of Wilfred Trotter, an anthology of his final essays, was published by Oxford University Press two years after his death.

Trotter was also the surgeon, at University College London for whom Wilfred Bion worked as a resident in his own medical training, before he famously studied groups and trained as a psychoanalyst at the Tavistock Clinic. In her account of Bion's life "The Days of our Years," his wife, Francesca, writes of the great influence Trotter had on the direction of Bion's work on group relations.

Edward Bernays, author of Propaganda and nephew of Freud's, also refers to Trotter and Gustave Le Bon in his writings.

Trotter met Sigmund Freud several times. According to Ernest Jones (Freud's first biographer), "he was one of the first two or three in England to appreciate the significance of Freud's work, which I came to know through him. He was one of the rapidly diminishing group who attended the first International Congress at Salzburg in 1908".

Major works
Trotter's popular book, The Instincts of the Herd in Peace and War is an analysis of group psychology and the ability of large numbers of people to be swayed through an innate tendency. In it he popularised in English the concept, first developed by French sociologist, Gustave Le Bon, of an instinct over-riding the will of the individual in favour of the group.

Trotter's writings about herd mentality, which began as early as 1905 and were published as a paper in two parts in 1908 and 1909 are considered by some to represent a breakthrough in the understanding of group behaviour, long before its study became important in a variety of fields, from workplace relations to marketing.

Bibliography

Trotter, W. (1908). "Herd instinct and its bearing on the psychology of civilized man – part 1." Sociological Review, July. 
Trotter, W. (1909). "Herd instinct and its bearing on the psychology of civilized man – part 2." Sociological Review, January.
Trotter, W. (1919). Instincts of the Herd in Peace and War – 4th impression, with postscript. New York, MacMillan. 
Cooke, D. (1987). "Book review – WILFRED TROTTER, Instincts of the herd in peace and war 1916–1919, London, Keynes Press, 1985." Medical History 31(1): 113–4. 
Holdstock, D. (1985). Introduction. in: Instincts of the herd in peace and war 1916-1919. W. Trotter. London, Keynes Press: pp xxviii.

See also

References

External links
Review of The Building of Bion.

1872 births
1939 deaths
People from Coleford, Gloucestershire
English neurosurgeons
Academics of University College London
Crowd psychologists
Fellows of the Royal Society
20th-century English medical doctors
English psychologists
20th-century surgeons